Željka Nikolić (born 12 July 1991) is a Serbian female handball player for SCM Râmnicu Vâlcea and the Serbian national team.

She was given the award of Cetățean de onoare ("Honorary Citizen") of the city of Craiova in 2018.

Honours

Club
EHF Champions League:
Winner: 2015
EHF Cup:
Winner: 2018

Individual
 Prosport Best Right Wing of the Romanian Liga Națională: 2018

References

External links

1991 births
Living people
People from Priboj
Serbian female handball players
Expatriate handball players
Serbian expatriate sportspeople in Montenegro
Serbian expatriate sportspeople in Romania
SCM Râmnicu Vâlcea (handball) players
Mediterranean Games competitors for Serbia
Competitors at the 2009 Mediterranean Games
21st-century Serbian women